Slippery Slide is a 1980 Australian television film Donald Crombie and starring Jon Blake, Simon Burke, Gerry Duggan, John Waters, and Arkie Whiteley.

Premise
An examination of the relevant life experience of a boy and his sister who have gone through the "welfare" system as neglected children, been given to foster parents, and eventually, through a series of incidents, end up in gaol.

References

External links

1980 films
1980 television films
Australian television films
Films directed by Donald Crombie
1980s English-language films